This Is Unity Music is the second full-length album by Common Rider, released in 2002.

Track listing 
All songs written by Jesse Michaels.
 "Firewall" - 2:56
 "Set the Method Down" - 2:06
 "Small Pebble" - 3:40
 "Cool This Madness Down" 2:32
 "Long After Lights Out" 2:33
 "Blackbirds vs. Crows" -  2:41
 "Time Won't Take Away" - 3:19
 "Prison Break" - 2:14
 "Midnight Passenger" - 2:45
 "One Ton" - 2:13
 "Toss Around" - 2:14
 "Long Shot" - 3:25

Personnel 
 Jesse Michaels - Vocals, Guitar
 Mass Giorgini - Bass, Saxophone
 Dan Lumley - Drums, Percussion
Featuring
 Phillip Hill - Guitar, Vocals
 Matt Demeester - Guitar, Vocals
 Audrey Marrs - Keyboards
 Additional Back Up Vocals - Matt Skiba, Dan Andriano, Brendan Kelly, Chris McCaughn, Kevin Sierzega, Joe Mizzi, Jimmy Lucido, Ray Moses and Rick Muermann

References 

2002 albums
Common Rider albums
Hopeless Records albums